Midnight on the Water may refer to:

Midnight on the Water (David Bromberg album), 1975
Midnight on the Water (Mark O'Connor album), 1998